The 2013–14 Svenska Cupen was the 58th season of Svenska Cupen and the second season with the current layout.

A total of 96 clubs entered the competition. The first round commenced on 21 May 2013 and the final was scheduled to be contested in May 2014, As of May 2013 it is still unknown if the final will return to Friends Arena in Solna or if the previous policy with the final being played at one of the finalists stadiums will return. The winners of the competition will earn a place in the second qualifying round of the 2014–15 UEFA Europa League, if they have not already qualified for European competition; if so then the runners-up will instead qualify for the first qualifying round of the competition and the team  having finished third in the 2014 Allsvenskan will enter the second qualifying round instead of the first qualifying round and their respective berth will be passed down to the fourth team in the league. IFK Göteborg were the defending champions, having beaten Djurgårdens IF 3–1 on penalties after the match had finished 1–1 after extra time in last season's final. They were knocked out by Superettan newcomers IK Sirius in the quarter-finals. IF Elfsborg won their third Svenska Cupen title on 18 May 2014 after defeating Helsingborgs IF 1–0.

The only three associations of the Swedish District Football Associations that had a qualifying tournament were Dalarnas FF, Hälsinglands FF and Örebro Läns FF, the other districts decided their teams by Distriktsmästerskap (District Championships) or by club ranking 2012.

Qualified teams

Dalarnas FF qualification 
The first round commenced on 10 March 2013 and the final was contested on 28 May 2013. The four highest ranked teams in Dalarnas FF (except IK Brage) entered in the quarter-finals. The number in brackets, indicate what tier of Swedish football each team competed in for the 2013 season.

Hälsinglands FF qualification 
In this qualification the winner of 2012 Distriktsmästerskapet, Rengsjö SK played a match against the winner of 2013 Distriktsmästerskapet, Hudiksvalls FF. The match was played on 25 June 2013. The number in brackets, indicate what tier of Swedish football each team competed in for the 2013 season.

Örebro Läns FF qualification 
The first matches were played on 27 February 2013 and the last match was played on 27 March 2013. The number in brackets, indicate what tier of Swedish football each team competed in for the 2013 season.

Group 1

Group 2

Footnotes

References

External links
 Official site 

2013-14 Q
Cupen Q
Cupen Q